Sylvester was a medieval Bishop of Worcester.

Sylvester was elected Prior of Worcester on 21 January 1215. He was elected to the see of Worcester on 3 April 1216 and consecrated on 3 July 1216. He was enthroned at Worcester Cathedral on 8 September 1216. He died on 16 July 1218.

Citations

References
 British History Online Bishops of Worcester accessed on 3 November 2007
 British History Online Priors of Worcester accessed on 3 November 2007
 

Bishops of Worcester
Priors of Worcester
1218 deaths
13th-century English Roman Catholic bishops
Year of birth unknown